John Michael Bolger (born June 27, 1956) is an American actor who resides in the Hell's Kitchen area of Manhattan's Westside.  

Bolger appeared in Michael Mann's Public Enemies, portraying 1930s East Chicago, Indiana detective Martin Zarkovich.

Most recently Bolger has been seen on television in Law & Order: Special Victims Unit, Law & Order: Criminal Intent and Blind Justice. Bolger is perhaps most well known for his three-season run in the NBC hit series Third Watch where series fans know him as FDNY Lieutenant Johnson.  His television credits span twenty years and include NYPD Blue, Brooklyn South, Beauty and the Beast and ER among others.  Bolger has been seen in the films Carlito's Way (starring Al Pacino) and Twins (starring Danny DeVito and Arnold Schwarzenegger). Bolger starred in several independently released films including Rounding First, Closer to Home, and Artists of Hell's Kitchen.

Filmography

External links

1956 births
Living people
20th-century American male actors
21st-century American male actors
American male film actors
American male television actors
Place of birth missing (living people)